The Men's scratch was held on 15 October 2015.

Results

References

Men's scratch
European Track Championships – Men's scratch